Macdonald "Mac" Smith (March 18, 1890 – August 31, 1949) was one of the top professional golfers in the world from about 1910 into the mid-1930s. He was a member of a famous Scottish golfing family. Smith is regarded, based on his results, as one of the best golfers of all time who never won a major championship. He won 25 official events on the PGA Tour, and placed in the top ten of major championships a total of 17 times.

Early life and family

Born in Carnoustie, Scotland, the son of John D. Smith and Joann Smith (née Robinson), Smith learned his golf on the world famous and very difficult Carnoustie Golf Links.

Immigrates to US
He emigrated to the United States on March 8, 1908, at age 17 to seek better golfing opportunities, which he eventually found in America. He applied for, and was granted, American citizenship on July 31, 1918, from the Superior Court of San Diego County, California. At the time, Smith was serving in the U.S. Army at Camp Kearny in San Diego during World War I.

In December 1922, he was married to Louise A. Cahill (1876–1952), a woman 14 years his senior who had been widowed in 1907 when her first husband, Joseph Harvey, died.

Golf career
Smith was the club professional at the country club in Del Monte, California, where future two-time major champion Olin Dutra and his brother Mortie started as caddies.

Two of Smith's older brothers won the U.S. Open: Willie in 1899, and Alex in both 1906 and 1910. Brothers George and Jim also played golf at a very high standard. Early in his career, Macdonald Smith was in a three-man playoff at the U.S. Open in 1910 won by his brother Alex; John McDermott finished second and Macdonald Smith finished third.

Smith won 25 times on the early PGA Tour, with his five wins in 1926 marking his peak season. But he never won a modern major championship, trailing only Harry Cooper for most wins without a modern major. His 25 Tour wins are also the most by any eligible player not inducted into the World Golf Hall of Fame.

Play in major championships
Smith finished in the top ten at modern majors 17 times, including three second-place finishes: at the U.S. Open in 1930 and The Open Championship in 1930 and 1932, both in England. His runner-up finishes at both Opens in 1930 were to noted amateur Bobby Jones, the winner of the grand slam that year. Gene Sarazen won the 1932 Open Championship. Smith scored four more wins in significant U.S. tournaments, between 1912 and 1926, all of which came in events later classified as PGA Tour events.

Smith suffered a heartbreaking near-miss at Prestwick Golf Club in Scotland in the 1925 Open Championship, when he was the 54-hole leader. He shot a disappointing 82 in the final round and finished three strokes back, in fourth place; Jim Barnes won. Crowd control broke down (with too few marshals and no gallery roping), with the numerous spectators, many of whom had traveled to watch him, invading the playing areas, causing delays, chaotic conditions, and deflected shots. Many of them had entered without paying admission—the so-called 'Aberdeen Gate' -- simply climbing over the seaside dunes to walk onto the course. British organizers never returned to Prestwick for another Open Championship, and had to vastly improve gallery control for future Opens.

Smith related to the teacher and author Harvey Penick an unfortunate story about another near-miss in an Open Championship. Smith was leading at lunch on the final day, with 18 holes to play. But, in the final round, his tee shots kept winding up in poor lies or on trampled ground. Smith believed that bookies who had taken bets on him at 5–1 odds were running ahead and tampering with his ball location, making it tougher for him to hit good shots.

His majors were primarily the two Opens; he never entered the PGA Championship, then a match play competition, and played in just one Masters Tournament, the first in 1934. His final major was the U.S. Open in 1937, where he finished in a tie for 40th place. The previous year was his last top ten, in fourth place.

Western Open; North and South Open; Los Angeles Open; Canadian Open
Smith won the Western Open three times, in 1912, 1925, and 1933, when it was a prestigious tournament rivaling the majors in stature. He won the 1925 North and South Open, which during this era was considered a major by many. His four wins in the Los Angeles Open, another top event which featured strong fields, were also significant, as was his title in the 1926 Canadian Open, a national championship. Smith had a near decade-long dry spell, between 1915 and 1923, without winning a tournament.

Smith's full-swing technique was much admired as one of the best of the hickory shaft era. Bing Crosby, himself an excellent player who followed golf closely, said that Smith's swing was better than any he had ever seen. Ben Hogan studied Smith's swing intently to improve his own. Smith employed a strong grip, with both hands turned more to the right on the club, which produced a draw on the majority of his full shots. Another admirer of Smith's full-swing technique was teacher Harvey Penick. Penick wrote "The prettiest swing I ever saw belonged to Macdonald Smith. His swing was full and flowing and graceful." Smith also won several Tour events after the introduction of steel shafts for golf clubs in the late 1920s.

Smith had a 25-season span between his first (1912) and last (1936) PGA Tour wins, and only four players have longer spans: Sam Snead, Phil Mickelson, Raymond Floyd, and Davis Love III; all four of those players are in the World Golf Hall of Fame.

Later life
Smith became the resident golf professional at Oakmont Country Club in Glendale, California, from 1934 to 1949. He won a PGA Tour event, the Oakmont Open, there in 1935. He continued to play a few PGA Tour events per season into the early 1940s.  He was playing with Babe Didrikson at Oakmont when she scored her first hole in one in 1936. Smith was inducted into the PGA Hall of Fame in 1954.

Death and legacy
Smith died of a heart attack  on August 31, 1949, in Glendale, California. He is widely regarded as one of the best players of all time who never won a major championship. His total of 25 PGA Tour wins is the most by any eligible player not already inducted into the World Golf Hall of Fame.

Professional wins

PGA Tour wins (25)
1912 (1) Western Open
1924 (2) California Open, Northern California Open
1925 (4) California Open, North and South Open, Western Open, Long Island Open
1926 (5) Texas Open, Dallas Open, Canadian Open, Metropolitan Open, Chicago Open Championship
1928 (3) Los Angeles Open, Palos Verdes Golf Club Open, South Central Open
1929 (2) Los Angeles Open, Long Island Open
1930 (1) Long Island Open
1931 (2) Metropolitan Open, Long Island Open
1932 (1) Los Angeles Open
1933 (1) Western Open
1934 (1) Los Angeles Open
1935 (1) Oakmont Open
1936 (1) Seattle Open

Other wins (4)
[This list may be incomplete]
1914 Pennsylvania Open Championship, Metropolitan Open
1924 Miami International Four-Ball (with Bill Mehlhorn)
1926 Miami International Four-Ball (with Bill Mehlhorn)

Results in major championships

Note: Smith never played in the PGA Championship.

NYF = tournament not yet founded
NT = no tournament
WD = withdrew
"T" indicates a tie for a place

Summary

Most consecutive cuts made – 26 (1915 U.S. Open – 1937 U.S. Open)
Longest streak of top-10s – 4 (1930 U.S. Open – 1931 Open Championship)

See also
List of golfers with most PGA Tour wins

References

External links
PGA Golf Professional Hall of Fame – member profiles

Scottish male golfers
American male golfers
PGA Tour golfers
Golfers from California
United States Army personnel of World War I
Scottish emigrants to the United States
Golfers from Carnoustie
Sportspeople from Angus, Scotland
Sportspeople from Glendale, California
1890 births
1949 deaths